Mateusz Janik (born 20 November 1995) is a Polish biathlete. He has competed in the Biathlon World Cup, and represented Poland at the Biathlon World Championships 2015 and Biathlon World Championships 2016.

References

1995 births
Living people
Polish male biathletes
People from Wałbrzych
Biathletes at the 2012 Winter Youth Olympics